The Clifton Heights Historic District is a  historic district in Natchez, Mississippi, USA, that was listed on the National Register of Historic Places in 1982. It then included 41 contributing buildings.

The neighborhood started as a subdivision, one of the first in Natchez, in 1888 by the Clifton Heights Improvement Corporation. Its historic buildings were built mostly during 1888–1910 in Queen Anne and Colonial Revival styles of architecture. It includes all three known Natchez examples of Shingle Style article, at 217 and 219 and 310 Linton Avenue, and also the only known Tudor architecture in Natchez. Other architecture also appears.
The district was deemed significant as "the most architecturally and historically significant collection of late nineteenth and early twentieth-century residences in Natchez".

Description 
Clifton Heights Historic District is located on an elevation more than 200 feet above the Mississippi River. The district is split up from the river by steep bluffs, the jagged edges of which the historic district’s western boundary of the western side is formed, and by the low-lying lands underneath the bluffs from which the river bank is formed. The district emerged on the grounds of, and got its name from, Clifton, the early 19th-century suburban mansion that was demolished in 1863 at the time of the Union occupation of Natchez. Evolved as one of the earliest corporate subdivisions of the city in the late 19th century, the district boundaries follow the 1888 subdivision plat with the exception that the district excludes the northern side of Maple Street, formerly recognized as Cemetery Road, which stands east of Ridge Alley and Postlethwaite Alley. This area was developed after the adjoining streets to the west; while being developed, it did not maintain the character of the primary Clifton Heights development.

Significance 
The Historic District illustrates the most architecturally and historically remarkable collection of late 19th and early 20th century houses in Natchez. The architectural magnitude is based on the high degree of architectural finish portrayed by many of the houses, on their individual architectural significance, and on the overall integrity of the locality. Situated inside the district boundaries, are the only Natchez examples of the Shingle and Tudor Styles as well as some of the town’s finest examples of Queen Anne and Colonial Revival architecture. Clifton Heights was one of the earliest corporate subdivisions of Natchez which was created in 1888 by the Clifton Heights Improvement Corporation. Partners Isaac Lowenburg and Henry Frank were remarkable Natchez merchants. They acquired the land from the Surget family, whose splendid mansion Clifton was demolished by the Union Army at the time of the Civil War occupation of the city. However, the Historic District got its initial historical importance from its connection to the Jewish community of Natchez.

Most of the houses were built for famous Natchez Jewish families⁠—the elegance of the residences shows the town’s Jewish citizens’ prosperity and prominence in the late 19th and early 20th centuries. Less affected economically by the Civil War than the Natchez planters, the Jewish citizens, who in the first place were engaged in the mercantile business, blossomed after the war to such an extent that they played leading roles in the cultural, social, economic, and political life of Natchez in the late 19th and early 20th centuries. The flourishing Jewish community, which currently has dwindled to a small number of families failing to assist the services of a rabbi, was responsible for the construction of most of the magnificent post-Civil War commercial and residential establishments of Natchez.

References 

Queen Anne architecture in Mississippi
Shingle Style architecture in Mississippi
Colonial Revival architecture in Mississippi
Historic districts in Natchez, Mississippi
Historic districts on the National Register of Historic Places in Mississippi
National Register of Historic Places in Natchez, Mississippi